David Rijckaert or Ryckaert may refer to any of these Flemish painters active in Antwerp in the 17th century:
David Rijckaert I
David Rijckaert II (1586–1642), Flemish painter and art dealer
David Ryckaert III (1612–1661), Flemish painter